Gottfried von Neifen (fl. 1234–1255) was a German Minnesänger (lyric poet).

Gottfried was born to an Edelfrei famly of Swabia. He was associated with the court of King Henry VII of Germany (1220–1235) and is mentioned in documents between 1234 and 1255. Other poets associated with the court of Henry (VII) are Burkhart von Hohenfels and Ulrich von Winterstetten.

Gottfried's poetry falls squarely within the conventions of courtly love. His language is somewhat more sensual than typical, with references to sparkling eyes (spilnde ougen) and red lips (rôter munt). He stands out, however, for his adept handling of rhyme. His form was directly influenced by the Old Occitan lyric. His lightness and verbal agility were an influence on Konrad von Altstetten. His verbal artistry combined with an emphasis on form over social or ethical considerations has been labelled "mannerist".

The manuscript attributions to Gottfried of a few obscene songs about peasants and craftsmen are doubted by some modern scholars. Under the name Götfrit von Nifen, he is represented in the 14th-century Codex Manesse by 51 love songs (Minnelieder) totaling 190 stanzas. He is also portrayed alongside his coat-of-arms in an illustration. A prolific and influential poet, his work has often been denigrated by moderns for its shallowness. The following are two excerpts from two different poems, once illustrative of his conventional poetry and the other of his "blatant use of words for the sake of words".

Notes

Sources

External links

13th-century German poets
German male poets
Minnesingers